Reading Corporation Tramways operated a tramway service in Reading in the English county of Berkshire between 1901 and 1939.

The tramway is one of the ancestors of the current Reading Buses, the town's municipally owned bus operator.

History
The corporation purchased the assets of the horse drawn services of the Reading Tramways Company and took ownership from 1901. Modernisation was undertaken and the first electric service started operating in July 1903. Extensions were constructed to the Wokingham Road and London Road (both from Cemetery Junction), and new routes added to Whitley, Caversham Road, Erleigh Road and Bath Road. The trams operated from a new depot in Mill Lane, a site that was to remain Reading Transport's main depot until it was demolished to make way for The Oracle shopping mall in 1998.

The electric tram services were originally operated by 30 four-wheeled double decked cars supplied by Dick, Kerr & Co. In 1904, six bogie cars and a water car (used for keeping down the dust on the streets) were added to the fleet, also from Dick, Kerr & Co. No further trams were acquired, and a planned extension from the Caversham Road terminus across Caversham Bridge to Caversham itself was abandoned because of the outbreak of World War I. The war also led to a significant maintenance backlog.

Closure

In 1919, Reading Corporation started operating its first motor buses. These ran from Caversham Heights to Tilehurst, running over the tram lines and beyond the tram termini. Because of the state of the track, the Bath Road tram route was abandoned in 1930, followed by the Erleigh Road route in 1932. Eventually it was decided that the tramways should be abandoned and replaced by trolleybuses, operating over extended routes. The last tram ran on the Caversham Road to Whitley route in July 1936, and last car on the main line ran in May 1939.

All remaining infrastructure was removed after the subsequent cessation of trolleybuses in 1968, with the exception of a pole outside The Three Tuns near the Wokingham Road route terminus, and a plaque on the Erleigh Road route.

Gallery

References

External links 
 British Tramway Company Uniforms and Insignia

Tram transport in England
4 ft gauge railways in England
Companies based in Reading, Berkshire
Transport in Reading, Berkshire